By Quantum Physics: A Nightlife Venture is a 2019 South Korean crime film starring Park Hae-soo, Seo Yea-ji, and Kim Sang-ho.

Plot
The story is about a night club owner Lee Chan-woo (Park Hae-soo), his club manager Seong Eun-yeong (Seo Yea-ji), and police reporter Park ki-hum (Kim Sang-ho) that fights with an organized crime which involved alleged drug abuse and police corruption.

Cast 
 Park Hae-soo as Lee Chan-woo, a nightclub promoter 
 Seo Yea-ji as Sung Eun-young, the nightclub manager
 Kim Sang-ho as Park Ki-hun
 Kim Eung-soo as Jung Kap-taek, a corrupt businessman and gangster
 Byun Hee-bong as Baek Young-kam, a corrupt politician
 Kim young-jae as Choi Ji-hoon
 Lee Chang-hoon as Yang Yoon-sik, a corrupt prosecutor
 Park Sung-yeon as Prosecutor Yang's assistant
 Im Chul-soo as Kim Sang-soo
 Hyun Bong-sik as Kim Kwan-chul
 Joo Suk-tae as Department Head Moon
 Son Jong-hak as Bureau Director Kim
 Park Kwang-sun as Fractal
 Choi Tae-joon as Kim Jung-min
 Kim Won-sik as Criminal Intelligence Division Team Leader Min
 Kim Jung-woo as Prosecutor Choi
 Kim Mi-hye as Reporter Lee Sun-hee

Awards and nominations

References

External links 
 
 
  
 

2019 films
2019 crime films
2010s Korean-language films
South Korean crime films
Films about drugs
Films about corruption
2010s South Korean films